Jorge Monard is an Ecuadorian boxer. He competed in the men's bantamweight event at the 1980 Summer Olympics. At the 1980 Summer Olympics, he lost to Geraldi Issaick of Tanzania.

References

Year of birth missing (living people)
Living people
Ecuadorian male boxers
Olympic boxers of Ecuador
Boxers at the 1980 Summer Olympics
Place of birth missing (living people)
Bantamweight boxers